George Mark Mickelson (born March 27, 1966) is an American lawyer, accountant, and politician who served as a member of the South Dakota House of Representatives, representing District 13 from 2013 to 2019. He is a Republican and a member of the prominent Mickelson family of South Dakota.

Early life and education

George Mark Mickelson was born to George Speaker Mickelson in 1965. His father was the 28th Governor of South Dakota. His grandfather, George Theodore Mickelson was the 18th Governor of South Dakota. Mickelson graduated from the University of South Dakota with a B.S. in accounting. He then went on to Harvard Law School to obtain his J.D.

Private Life
George Mark Mickelson married Cynthia Hart on August 31, 1996, and has three sons. The oldest is George Mickelson. Followed by David Mickelson and their third son is Charles Hart Mickelson. He also has a niece named Katherine and a nephew. Named Max.

Political career
When incumbent Representatives Democrat Susy Blake and Republican Brian Liss left the Legislature and left both the District 13 seats open, Mickelson ran in the three-way June 5, 2012 Republican Primary and placed first with 2,063 votes (53.6%); Mickelson and fellow Republican nominee Steven Westra were unopposed for the November 6, 2012 General election, where Mickelson took the first seat with 7,122 votes (58.06%) and Westra took the second seat.

Mickelson served as the South Dakota Speaker of the House Representatives like his father and grandfather before him. Mickelson decided to retire from politics in 2018, after choosing not to run for Governor of South Dakota, again an office his father and grandfather previously held.

References

External links
South Dakota Legislative Research Council
Official page at the South Dakota Legislature
Campaign site
 

1966 births
21st-century American politicians
Harvard Law School alumni
Living people
Place of birth missing (living people)
Politicians from Sioux Falls, South Dakota
Speakers of the South Dakota House of Representatives
Republican Party members of the South Dakota House of Representatives
University of South Dakota alumni